Ta Sanh is a khum (commune) of Samlout District in Battambang Province in north-western Cambodia.

Villages

 Anlong Pouk
 Doun Trit
 Ou Sngout
 Ou Tontim
 Prey Rumchek
 Ta Sanh Khang Chhueng
 Ta Sanh Khang Tboang

References

Communes of Battambang province
Samlout District